Rezart Rama (born 4 December 2000) is a professional footballer who most recently played as a centre-back for Canadian club Forge FC. Born in Greece, he has represented Albania at youth international levels.

Early life
Rama was born in Athens, Greece, and grew up in neighbouring Piraeus. He developed in the academy of Olympiacos from 2010 to 2019. where he scored two goals in 23 appearances for the Olympiacos U19 in 2018-19. In 2019, he joined the Nottingham Forest youth system, featuring extensively with the U19 team in 2019, before moving up to the U23 team in the Premier League 2.

Club career
He made his first team debut for Nottingham Forest in a 2021 pre-season friendly on 10 July against Alfreton Town. In September 2021, he went on loan to Southern Premier League South side Truro City. After returning to Forest that season, he went on to make fifteen appearances in Premier League 2, before being released.

On 19 May 2022, Rama signed with Canadian Premier League side Forge FC. He made his professional debut as a starter the following day in a 4–0 win over HFX Wanderers.

International career
Rama played for the Albanian U17 team in 2015 and 2016 and the U19 team in 2017 and 2018. He also served as captain of both teams.

Career statistics

References

External links

2000 births
Living people
Association football defenders
Albanian footballers
Greek footballers
Footballers from Piraeus
Greek people of Albanian descent
Albanian expatriate footballers
Greek expatriate footballers
Expatriate footballers in England
Albanian expatriate sportspeople in England
Greek expatriate sportspeople in England
Expatriate soccer players in Canada
Albanian expatriate sportspeople in Canada
Greek expatriate sportspeople in Canada
Olympiacos F.C. players
Nottingham Forest F.C. players
Truro City F.C. players
Forge FC players
Southern Football League players
Canadian Premier League players
Albania youth international footballers